Louis Charles Nistico (25 January 1953 – 27 November 2020) was a Canadian professional ice hockey player who played 3 games in the National Hockey League and 186 games in the World Hockey Association.  He played with the Colorado Rockies, Toronto Toros, and Birmingham Bulls.
Lou later got back into hockey at the Jr.A level as a GM and Coach in the CJHL, now CCHL. He won championships in Ottawa with the Junior Senators and was also the general manager for the Kanata Stallions and assistant general manager for the Hawkesbury Hawks.

He died on 27 November 2020, at the age of 67.

Regular season and playoffs

References

External links
 

1953 births
2020 deaths
Birmingham Bulls players
Buffalo Norsemen players
Canadian ice hockey left wingers
Colorado Rockies (NHL) players
Jacksonville Barons players
London Knights players
Minnesota North Stars draft picks
Mohawk Valley Comets (NAHL) players
Ontario Hockey Association Senior A League (1890–1979) players
Phoenix Roadrunners (CHL) players
Sportspeople from Thunder Bay
Toronto Toros draft picks
Toronto Toros players